Paul VI High School is a high school located in Montreal, Quebec, Canada. It is a part of the English Montreal School Board.

Prior to 1998 it was operated by the Montreal Catholic School Commission.

References

External links

High schools in Montreal
English-language schools in Quebec
Educational institutions established in 1979
English Montreal School Board
Ahuntsic-Cartierville
1979 establishments in Quebec